The Peace and Democracy Party (BDP) was a Kurdish political party in Turkey existing from 2008 to 2014.

Development 
BDP succeeded the Democratic Society Party (DTP) in 2008, following the closure of the latter party for its alleged connections with the Kurdistan Workers' Party (PKK). The BDP was co-chaired by Selahattin Demirtaş and Gültan Kışanak. One-third of its representatives were Alevi.

The Deputy Chairs were Pervin Buldan and İdris Baluken. In the elections the BDP supported the Labour, Democracy and Freedom Bloc, which achieved the election of 35 Members of Parliament.

After municipal elections on 30 March 2014, Berivan Elif Kilic became the co-mayor of Kocaköy, a farming town of 17,000 people in Turkey’s Kurdish region. Kilic shared the post of mayor with her male running mate, Affullah Kar, a former Imam. Under BDP party rules, all top positions are split between a man and a woman, in an effort to promote women’s participation in politics.

Ideology 
The party chairman has called for the PKK to disarm. The BDP had observer status in the Socialist International. BDP supported Turkey's membership in the European Union, same-sex marriages in Turkey, an anti-discrimination law to protect LGBT people and also wants the Government of Turkey to recognize the Armenian genocide.

Peoples' Democratic Party 
Pro-minority rights and feminist Peoples' Democratic Party (HDP) acted as the fraternal party to BDP. At the 2014 municipal elections, HDP ran parallel to BDP, with the BDP running in Turkey's Kurdish-dominated southeast while the HDP competed in the rest of the country except Mersin Province and Konya Province where BDP launched its own candidates.

After the local elections, the two parties were re-organised in a joint structure. On 28 April 2014, the entire parliamentary caucus of BDP joined HDP, whereas BDP was assigned exclusively to representatives on the local administration level.

Legal prosecution 
The BDP has reported that between April 2009 and October 2011 more than 7500 BDP members were detained and over 3000 were arrested.

Reorganisation
At the 3rd Congress of the party on 11 July 2014, the name was changed to the Democratic Regions Party and a new structure restricting activities on the local/regional government level was adopted.

References

External links
Official website

Kurdish nationalist political parties
Political parties established in 2008
2008 establishments in Turkey
Defunct Kurdish parties in Turkey
2014 disestablishments in Turkey
Political parties disestablished in 2014
Defunct social democratic parties in Turkey
Kurdish nationalism in Turkey